The Sufyani is an evil figure in Islamic eschatology, usually portrayed in hadith as a tyrant who will spread corruption and mischief. According to Shia Hadith, the Sufyani will rise in the month of Rajab. The predicted location of his arrival is in Damascus.

Reports about the Sufyani are available in both Sunni and Shia Hadith. The Sufyani is a not to be confused with another villainous figure of end times, the  Dajjal. It is said that he:

 will kill children and rip out the bellies of women,
 murder those from the household of the Prophet,
 and will rule over Syria.

It is also said that when the Mahdi appears, Sufyani will send an army to seize and kill him, but, when Sufyani and his army would reach the desert of Bayda, they would be swallowed.

However some (mostly Sunni) sources claim Hadith describing the Sufyani as tyrannical figure of end times as unreliable, based on a "garbled version" of a legend "fabricated by traditionists with Shi'ite and pro- 'Abbasid sentiments". Others reverse his role as an evil-doer, describing him as an ally not enemy of the Mahdi.

Prophecies

Prior to Sufyani 
Before Sufyani, a sedition will arise in the Maghreb and spread in every direction such that no party or group could protect itself from it.

Disorder, strife, and fear will emerge in the Magrib (west)... Strife will proliferate.

 A kind of corruption will surface from which no party will be able to protect itself, and spread immediately in every direction. This situation will persist until one comes and says: "O people, from now on your leader is Imam Mahdi(as)."

Later the sedition which started in the west will arrive in Shaam (Levant): two banners will fight for control over the region; fighting until their armies are exhausted.

Appearance of Sufyani
It is said that following these events, the Sufyani will appear in Damascus, and that he will start an uprising in the dry valley of Transjordan and move to seize Damascus; it is said that he will gain much support and that he will advance to capture the rest of Syria, defeating the two other competing forces. It is said that once he captures the five districts of Shaam, he will send armies to Iraq.

Abu Hurayrah narrates that the Prophet said:A man will emerge from the depths of Damascus. He will be called Sufyani. Most of those who follow him will be from the tribe of Kalb. He will kill by ripping the stomachs of women and even kill the children. A man from my family will appear in the Haram, the news of his advent will reach the Sufyani and he will send to him one of his armies. He (referring to the Mahdi) will defeat them. They will then travel with whoever remains until they come to a desert and they will be swallowed. None will be saved except the one who had informed the others about them.

Nu'aym bin Hammad quotes Khalid bin Ma'dan as saying, "The Sufyani will emerge with three staffs in his hand. Anyone whom he strikes with them will die."

Rule of the Sufyani 
It is said that the Sufyani will be followed, for the most part, by the tribe of Banu Kalb, and will fight with anyone daring to oppose him. Injustice will rule the day and the Sufyani's disregard for life will extend to women and children. The tribe of Qays will rise up against him; however, they will not succeed, and he will slaughter all of them. One of the Sufanyi's wonders consists of his staffs, which would kill anyone when he strikes them.

It is also said that the Sufyani's army will go to Kufa, a city in Iraq, and from there he will launch an attack against the Khurasan. At the Gate of Istakhr, Shu'ayb bin Salih and the Hashimites will join forces and engage his army. The battle will be cost many lives and Sufyani will suffer a temporary defeat. It is at this time that a yearning for the Mahdi's appearance becomes universal.

It is also said that the army of the Sufyani will march from the Iraq to seize the Mahdi, however, when they reach the desert near Dhi Hulayfah the ground will swallow them up. Two will escape to convey the news, but even when he learns of the occurrence he will not be deterred. Some people from the Quraysh escape to Constantinople, which will not be under Muslim control. The Sufyani will ask for their return and when they arrive they and their allies will be killed.

Death of Sufyani 

According to prophecies, when the Sufyani learns of the Mahdi, he and his army will go towards Iraq to attack Mahdi. When the army enters the territory of Bayda, the Earth will consume his army except 2 or 3 individuals. In regards to the event of Khasf-al-Bayda, diverse Hadiths describe the size of his army. Some sources say that the army  Sufyani will number 12,000; while some say 170,000 and some sources say 300,000 Shia commentator Shaikh Tabarsi interprets Quran verse 34:51 concerning the fate of the army of the Sufyani, referring to it as the army of the desert of Bayda, where the earth will swallow them.

Persons claiming to be Sufyani
At least nine figures revolted in the Levant using Sufyani as their title between 749 and 1413 CE. The first one was Ziad ibn Abdollah ibn Yazid ibn Muawiah ibn Abi Sufyan who revolted against Abbasids. The second Sufyani revolted in 754. Abu Harb al-Muburqa claimed the mantle about one hundred years later. In 1413, someone used this title and revolted against Mamluk Sultanate. He tried to exactly follow the Hadiths, but Mamluks suppressed and killed him.

Doubts, questions

On some of the details of the Sufyani tale Scholar Muhammad Benshili casts doubt, stating, it is not possible to determine whether he will send two armies against the Mahdi or only one, or if he himself will be swallowed up with his troops or remain in Baghdad.
Going beyond details to essence, at least one source (the Salafi fatwa site IslamQA.info) considers the hadith of Sufyani unsound, quoting Al-Albani (1914-1999) as declaring it munkar (going against another sahih hadith and reported to have a weak narrator) and citing imperfections in the isnad. 
Ibn ‘Uthaymeen also considered hadith of Sufyaani as weak narration.  (Mansour Leghaei also has his doubts about the veracity of the story. 

Scholar Wilferd Madelung writes that the prophesy of the Sufyani "as the rival and opponent of the Mahdi, has repeatedly attracted the attention of modern scholars", who trace it not to divine revelation but to enemies of the Abbasid dynasty and their various hopes that some "member of the Sufyinid branch of the house of Umayy" would lead an overthrow of the Abbasids and restore the Umayyad dynasty. Supporters of Abbasid dynasty then turned this into a prophesy of an AntiChrist figure who would kill good Muslims. 
"... The Syrians refused to admit the death of Abi Muhammad and believed that he was hiding in the mountains of al-Tā'if, from where he would reappear in triumph, a belief presumably patterned upon the Kaysini belief about Muhammad b. al-Ḥanafiyya. They created a legend with purely Syrian elements about him. Some of these are still recognizable in the garbled version fabricated by traditionists with Shi'ite and pro- 'Abbasid sentiments in which he was transformed from a Syrian hero into a figure resembling the Dajjal."

William McCants also finds a connection between Shia historical anger and the prophecy of an apocalyptic enemy named Sufyani. He writes that the Sufyani is alleged in hadith to descend from Abu Sufyan, whose son fought Muhammad's son-in-law, Ali, for control of the Islamic empire. Ibn Abu Sufyan eventually became caliph and established the Umayyad dynasty, but followers of "the losing side", who thought Ali should be Caliph Shia and "began circulating words of the Prophet prophesying the new dynasty's downfall at the hands of the Mahdi", quoting one prophecy as saying: "When the Sufyani reaches Kufa [a city in Iraq] and kills the supporters of the family of Muhammad, the Mahdi will come,"

In contrast, McCants writes that while Sunnis also have prophecies about a Sufyani, some include him in a heroic mode, "fighting on the side of the Mahdi against his enemies: 'The Sufyani and the Mahdi will come forth like two race horses. The Sufyani will subdue (the region) that is next to him, and the Mahdi will subdue (the region) next to him.'"  McCants quotes Adnan al-Aroor, a "popular Syrian Salafi cleric", hoping for the appearance of the Sufyani to lead the  Sunni rebels to victory in the Syrian civil war: "God willing, all of us will be in the army of the Sufyani, who will appear in (Syria) by the permission of God," prayed Adnan al-Arur, a popular Syrian Salafi cleric and supporter of the rebellion who currently lives in Saudi Arabia.

See also
 Khasf al-Bayda'
 Abu Muhammad al-Sufyani
 Al-Mubarqa
 Mahdi
 Masih ad-Dajjal
 Islamic eschatology
 Nafs-e-Zakiyyah (Pure soul)
 Reappearance of Muhammad al-Mahdi
 Signs of the reappearance of Muhammad al-Mahdi

Footnotes

References

External links
 Do we believe in the Sufyani who will allegedly come before the Dajjal?

Islamic eschatology
Shia eschatology
Islamic terminology
Mahdism